Sedang may refer to
 Sedang people, a people in Vietnam
 Sedang language, what they speak.
 Kingdom of Sedang, a defunct nineteenth-century kingdom in Indochina